Chianan Irrigation, also known as the Kanan Irrigation System, was built to support agricultural production in the Chianan Plain of Taiwan. The name "chia-nan" was derived from two place names among its surrounding area called Chiayi and Tainan. Although it includes some other facilities, such as the Wusanto Reservoir, the term "Chianan Canal", in a narrow sense, would only mean the canals of this system.

The main designer of the Chianan Canal is Yoichi Hatta, a civil engineer of the Japanese government. Its main streams pass through today's Tainan, Chiayi and Yunlin, formerly parts of Tainan Prefecture.  The architectural work of canal was launched in 1920 and completed in 1930, during Japanese rule. The canal improved the plantable area for rice from 5000 to 150,000 hectares, and made the rice crops in its irrigated area able to be harvested three times annually.

See also
Economic history of Taiwan
Peikang River
Tsengwen River

References

Geography of Taiwan
History of Taiwan
Economy of Taiwan
Agriculture in Taiwan
Hydraulic engineering
Tainan
Chiayi County
Yunlin County